Harriet Tubman Day is an American holiday in honor of the anti-slavery activist Harriet Tubman, observed on March 10, and in the U.S. state of New York.  Observances also occur locally around the U.S. state of Maryland.  After Juneteenth became a federal holiday, there are growing calls for this day to also be observed at the federal level.

History
The holiday was approved as Public Law 101-252 by the 101st Congress in a joint resolution on March 13, 1990.  The law was considered and passed by the U.S. Senate on March 6, 1990 and then was 
considered and passed through the U.S. House of Representatives on March 7, 1990.  U.S. President George H. W. Bush gave Proclamation 6107 on March 9, 1990 proclaiming the holiday.

In February 1995, Christ Episcopal Church, Great Choptank Parish, in Cambridge, Maryland celebrated (via a "service of song and word") Tubman's nomination, the previous year, to the liturgical Calendar of Saints of the Episcopal Church. The parish is the home of Dorchester County's Harriet Tubman Coalition. Final approval of naming her a saint occurred at the 1997 General Convention, and Tubman is now commemorated together with Amelia Bloomer,  Elizabeth Cady Stanton, and Sojourner Truth in the calendar of saints of the Episcopal Church on July 20. The calendar of saints of the Evangelical Lutheran Church in America remembers Tubman and Truth on March 10 which is also her date of birth because she was born in March.

Observances by state

Origins

Harriet Tubman (born Araminta Ross; March 10, 1913) was an American abolitionist, humanitarian, and an armed scout and spy for the United States Army during the American Civil War. Born into slavery, Tubman escaped and subsequently made some thirteen missions to rescue approximately seventy enslaved families and friends, using the network of antislavery activists and safe houses known as the Underground Railroad. She later helped abolitionist John Brown to recruit men for his raid on the Harpers Ferry. In the post-war era she was an active participant in the struggle for women's suffrage.

When the Civil War began, Tubman worked for the Union Army, first as a cook and nurse, and then as an armed scout and spy. The first woman to lead an armed expedition in the war, she guided the raid at Combahee Ferry, which liberated more than 700 slaves. After the war, she retired to the family home on property she had purchased in 1859 in Auburn, New York, where she cared for her aging parents. She was active in the women's suffrage movement until illness overtook her and she had to be admitted to a home for elderly African-Americans that she had helped to establish years earlier. After she died in 1913, she became an icon of American courage and freedom.

References

External links
 

Public holidays in the United States
March observances
State holidays in the United States
Harriet Tubman